Windy Hill in the South Pennines within the Metropolitan Borough of Rochdale in Greater Manchester, England, rises to  metres above sea level.

The hill is located west of the A672 road and south west of Junction 22 on the M62 motorway. Its parabolic arch and splayed legs are designed to withstand wind speeds up to 120 mph.
Snow lies on Windy Hill for an average of 35 days annually and the area is prone to fog or low cloud. The boundary stone between Greater Manchester and West Yorkshire is in the cutting. The Longden End Brook rises between the hill and the motorway and the Piethorne Brook drains to reservoirs to the southwest.
A radio transmitter is located to the east.

References

Bibliography

External links 

Geography of the Metropolitan Borough of Rochdale
Mountains and hills of Greater Manchester
Mountains and hills of the Pennines
Hills of West Yorkshire